Giovanni di Balduccio (c. 1290 – after 1339) was an Italian sculptor of the Medieval period.

Life
The artist was born in Pisa, and likely did not train directly with the famous Pisan sculptor Andrea Pisano. He travelled to Milan to help sculpt the arc of St. Peter Martyr now in the Portinari Chapel, in the Basilica of Sant'Eustorgio, work signed in 1339. He also worked on the portal of the church of the Brera in Milan. He also worked in San Casciano in Val di Pesa and in the monument of Guarniero in Sarzana.

His style is known from four signed works. These formed the basis for a reconstruction of his oeuvre.

Secondary Sources

References

External links

1290 births
14th-century deaths
People from Pisa
14th-century Italian sculptors
Italian male sculptors
Gothic sculptors